Brokaw bandgap reference is a voltage reference circuit widely used in integrated circuits, with an output voltage around 1.25 V with low temperature dependence. This particular circuit is one type of a bandgap voltage reference, named after Paul Brokaw, the author of its first publication.

Like all temperature-independent bandgap references, the circuit maintains an internal voltage source that has a positive temperature coefficient and another internal voltage source that has a negative temperature coefficient. By summing the two together, the temperature dependence can be canceled. Additionally, either of the two internal sources can be used as a temperature sensor.

In the Brokaw bandgap reference, the circuit uses negative feedback (by means of an operational amplifier) to force a constant current through two bipolar transistors with different emitter areas. By the Ebers–Moll model of a transistor,
 The transistor with the larger emitter area requires a smaller base–emitter voltage for the same current.
 The difference between the two base–emitter voltages has a positive temperature coefficient (i.e., it increases with temperature).
 The base–emitter voltage for each transistor has a negative temperature coefficient (i.e., it decreases with temperature).
The circuit output is the sum of one of the base–emitter voltages with a multiple of the base–emitter voltage differences. With appropriate component choices, the two opposing temperature coefficients will cancel each other exactly and the output will have no temperature dependence.

In the example circuit shown, the opamp ensures that its inverting and non-inverting inputs are at the same voltage. This means that the currents in each collector resistor are identical, so the collector currents of Q1 and Q2 are also identical. If Q2 has an emitter area that is N times larger than Q1, its base-emitter voltage will be lower than that of Q1 by a magnitude of kT/q*ln(N). This voltage is generated across R2 and so defines the current I in each leg as kT/q*ln(N)/R2. The output voltage (at the opamp output) is therefore VBE(Q1) + 2*I*R1, or VBE(Q1)+2*kT/q*ln(N)*R1/R2. 

The first (VBE) term has a negative temperature coefficient; the second term has a positive temperature coefficient (from the T term). By an appropriate choice of N and R1 and R2, these temperature coefficients can be made to cancel, giving an output voltage that is nearly independent of temperature. The magnitude of this output voltage can be shown to be approximately equal to the bandgap voltage (EG0) of Silicon extrapolated to 0 K.

See also
 LM317

References

External links
 Original IEEE paper(pdf) — This is the 1974 paper describing the circuit.
 A Transistor Voltage Reference, and What the Band-Gap Has To Do With It — This 1989 video features Paul Brokaw explaining his bandgap voltage reference.
 How to make a Bandgap Voltage Reference in One Easy Lesson by A. Paul Brokaw of IDT
 ELEN 689-602: Introduction to Bandgap Reference Generators — Includes detailed description and analysis of Brokaw bandgap reference.
 The Design of Band-Gap Reference Circuits: Trials and Tribulations — Robert Pease, National Semiconductor (In "The Best of Bob Pease", page 286, shows Brokaw cell in Figure 3)
 ECE 327: LM317 Bandgap Voltage Reference Example — Brief explanation of the temperature-independent bandgap reference circuit within the LM317. The circuit is nearly identical, but the document discusses how the circuit allows different currents through matched transistors (rather than a single current through different transistors) can set up the same voltages with opposing temperature coefficients.

Electronic circuits
Analog circuits